Baciu ( or Bács) is a commune in Cluj County, located in the region of Transylvania, in the northwestern part of Romania. Baciu lies a short distance from the county seat of Cluj-Napoca. It is composed of seven villages: Baciu, Corușu (Nádaskóród), Mera (Méra), Popești (Nádaspapfalva), Rădaia (Andrásháza), Săliștea Nouă (Csonkatelep), and Suceagu (Szucság).

The commune is located in the central part of the county, in the region called Țara Călatei, just west of the county seat, Cluj-Napoca. The river Nadăș (a left tributary of the Someșul Mic) flows through Baciu.

Demographics
According to the 2011 census, 61.5% of the population of Baciu were ethnic Romanians, 29.0% were ethnic Hungarians, and 6.4% were ethnic Romani.

Natives
 György Györffy

Notes

Communes in Cluj County
Localities in Transylvania